The 89th Assembly District of Wisconsin is one of 99 districts in the Wisconsin State Assembly.  Located in Northeastern Wisconsin, the district covers most of the eastern half of Oconto County, as well as neighboring municipalities in Marinette and Brown counties.  It includes the cities of Oconto and Marinette, as well as the village of Suamico and the eastern half of the village of Howard.  The district is represented by Republican Elijah Behnke, since May 2021.

The 89th Assembly district is located within Wisconsin's 30th Senate district, along with the 88th and 90th Assembly districts.

List of past representatives

Electoral history

References 

Wisconsin State Assembly districts
Oconto County, Wisconsin
Brown County, Wisconsin
Marinette County, Wisconsin